Air pollution in Lahore, Punjab, Pakistan is a recurring issue.  Pakistan has blamed India for air pollution, however Pakistani citizens do not agree.

November 2017
In November 2017 flights were cancelled because of air pollution.

January 2019
In January 2019 a smog wave prompted measures to reduce air pollution going forward.

April 2020
In April 2020 there was an outbreak of air pollution following the end of a COVID-19 lockdown in Pakistan.

November 2021
An outbreak of smog in November 2021 has made it difficult for citizens to breathe and colds, flu are common. While according to the latest statistics, Lahore is the number one in the world in terms of air pollution. The highest 680 AQI was recorded in Kot Lakhpat area of ​​Lahore.

5 special squads have been formed to fight smog, Metropolitan Corporation Lahore, Water and Sanitation Agency (Wasa), police, district administration and Lahore Electric Supply Company (Lesco)

References

2021 in Pakistan
Environmental issues in Pakistan
Lahore
Lahore District
Air pollution by region